Roc d'Azur is an annual mountain biking event held in Fréjus and Roquebrune-sur-Argens, France during October. It consists of a trade show and a few dozen races, attracting riders from various countries. The inaugural edition of the Roc d'Azur was run in 1984 and featured seven competitors, including event founder Stéphane Hauvette. The Roc d'Azur has since grown to become the biggest mountain biking event in the world.

List of winners

References 

Mountain biking events in France
Exhibitions in France
Sport in Var (department)